Aria is a community in the municipality of Nafplio, Argolis, southern Greece. It consists of the villages Aria and Exostis.

Populated places in Argolis